The Honda CB1000R is a CB series  four-cylinder standard or naked motorcycle made by Honda from 2008 to 2016, and resumed from 2018.

It was unveiled at EICMA November 2007 as a replacement for the CB900F Hornet, the US-market's 919.

The CB1000R's styling cues are borrowed from the 2007 CB600F Hornet. The front suspension uses a  inverted HMAS cartridge-type telescopic fork with stepless preload with compression/rebound adjustments and  travel. The rear is a monoshock with gas-charged HMAS damper with 10-step preload and stepless rebound damping adjustment and  axle travel.

In November 2017, Honda unveiled the new iteration of the CB1000R, along with the CB125R and CB300R. The bike uses a new styling direction dubbed as Neo Sports Café. This design language has been applied before to the CB150R ExMotion and then applied to the CB650R, the successor of the CB650F.

Specifications

References 
A new version of the CB1000R was launched in 2021 called the Black Edition, featuring several updates. 

See https://www.honda.co.uk/motorcycles/range/street/cb1000r-black-edition/overview.html

CB1000R
Standard motorcycles
Motorcycles introduced in 2008